Seimeni is a commune in Constanța County, Northern Dobruja, Romania.

The commune includes three villages:
 Seimeni (historical name: Seimenii Mari)
 Dunărea (historical names: Boasgic)
 Seimenii Mici

Demographics
At the 2011 census, Seimeni had 1,955 Romanians (99.80%), 4 others (0.20%).

Notable people
 

 Eugen Munteanu (born 1953), Romanian linguist

References

Communes in Constanța County
Localities in Northern Dobruja
Populated places on the Danube